The 1916 Auburn Tigers baseball team represented the Auburn Tigers of the Auburn University in the 1916 NCAA baseball season.

References

Auburn Tigers
Southern Intercollegiate Athletic Association baseball champion seasons
Auburn Tigers baseball seasons
Auburn Tigers